The MTV Europe Music Award for Best Push Act (Best Breakthrough Artist) was first awarded in 2009.

Winners and nominees
Winners are listed first and highlighted in bold.

2000s

2010s

2020s

References

External links
 

Best Push Act
Awards established in 2009